The Dent de Savigny is a mountain of the Bernese Alps, located on the border between the Swiss cantons of Vaud and Fribourg. With an elevation of 2,252 metres above sea level, it one of the highest mountains in the canton of Fribourg.

The closest localities are Jaun (Fribourg) and Rougemont (Vaud).

Ascension

References

External links
 Dent de Savigny on Hikr

Mountains of the Alps
Mountains of Switzerland
Mountains of the canton of Vaud
Mountains of the canton of Fribourg
Fribourg–Vaud border